The CSS Profile, short for the College Scholarship Service Profile, is an online application created and maintained by the United States-based College Board that allows college students to apply for non-federal financial aid. It is primarily designed to give member institutions of the College Board a comprehensive look at the financial and family situation of students and their families to use as they determine their eligibility for institutional financial aid. It is more detailed than the United States federal application, Free Application for Federal Student Aid or FAFSA.

References

External links
Official website

Student financial aid in the United States